Inosperma is a genus of gilled mushroom in the family Inocybaceae. Previously defined as a subgenus within the large genus Inocybe by Robert Kühner in 1980, these fungi were found to be more distantly related in a 2019 multigene phylogenetic study by Matheny and colleagues.

Description
This group of mushrooms was distinguished morphologically from other Inocybes by the absence of pleurocystidia and the shape of the spores.  Also the stem is usually longer than the cap is wide and the cheilocystidia consist each of a single cell and are often so numerous that they make the gill edge white. 

Inosperma is divided into two sections: Cervicolores (with a scaly cap) and Rimosae (with a radially fibrose or radially cracking ("rimose") cap).  The former includes I. bongardii and I. calamistratum whilst the latter takes in I. cookei, I. erubescens, I. maculatum and I. rimosum.

Selected species

References

 
Agaricales genera